At the 1952 Summer Olympics in Helsinki, four diving events were contested.

Medal summary
The events are labelled as 3 metre springboard and 10 metre platform by the International Olympic Committee, and appeared on the 1952 Official Report as springboard diving and high diving, respectively.

Men

Women

Medal table

Participating nations

See also
 Diving at the 1951 Pan American Games

Notes

References
 
 

 
1952 Summer Olympics events
1952
1952 in diving